Marsh House may refer to:

United Kingdom
 Marsh House, Darwen, Lancashire, England
 Marsh Farmhouse, an historic building in Thornton-Cleveleys, Lancashire, England

United States
 Martin Luther Marsh House, Nevada City, California
 Marsh Hall or the Othniel C. Marsh House, New Haven, Connecticut, designated a U.S. National Historic Landmark
 Marsh-Warthen House, a museum in Lafayette, Georgia
 William W. Marsh House, Sycamore, Illinois
 Palmer-Marsh House, Bath, North Carolina
 Marsh House (Fairfax, Virginia), a house in the City of Fairfax Historic District

See also
 Marsh Hall (disambiguation)

Architectural disambiguation pages